The Downtown Plant City Commercial District is a U.S. historic district (designated as such on June 8, 1993) located in Plant City, Florida. The district is bounded by Baker and Wheeler Streets and the Seaboard Coast Line RR tracks. It contains 38 historic buildings.

See also
Downtown Plant City Historic Residential District

References

External links
 Hillsborough County listings at National Register of Historic Places

National Register of Historic Places in Hillsborough County, Florida
Historic districts on the National Register of Historic Places in Florida
Plant City, Florida